The canton of Phalsbourg is an administrative division of the Moselle department, northeastern France. Its borders were modified at the French canton reorganisation which came into effect in March 2015. Its seat is in Phalsbourg.

It consists of the following communes:
 
Abreschviller
Arzviller
Aspach
Barchain
Berling
Bourscheid
Brouderdorff
Brouviller
Dabo
Danne-et-Quatre-Vents
Dannelbourg
Fraquelfing
Garrebourg
Guntzviller
Hangviller
Harreberg
Hartzviller
Haselbourg
Hattigny
Héming
Henridorff
Hérange
Hermelange
Hesse
Hommert
Hultehouse
Lafrimbolle
Landange
Laneuveville-lès-Lorquin
Lixheim
Lorquin
Lutzelbourg
Métairies-Saint-Quirin
Metting
Mittelbronn
Neufmoulins
Niderhoff
Niderviller
Nitting
Phalsbourg
Plaine-de-Walsch
Saint-Jean-Kourtzerode
Saint-Louis
Saint-Quirin
Schneckenbusch
Troisfontaines
Turquestein-Blancrupt
Vasperviller
Vescheim
Vilsberg
Voyer
Walscheid
Waltembourg
Wintersbourg
Xouaxange
Zilling

References

Cantons of Moselle (department)